On 13 March [1 March, Old Style], 1881, Alexander II, the Emperor of Russia, was assassinated in Saint Petersburg, Russia while returning to the Winter Palace from Mikhailovsky Manège in a closed carriage.

The assassination was planned by the Executive Committee of Narodnaya Volya ("People's Will"), chiefly by Andrei Zhelyabov. Of the four assassins coordinated by Sophia Perovskaya, two of them actually committed the deed. One assassin, Nikolai Rysakov, threw a bomb which damaged the carriage, prompting the Tsar to disembark. At this point a second assassin, Ignacy Hryniewiecki, threw a bomb that fatally wounded Alexander II.

Alexander II had previously survived several attempts on his life, including the attempts by Dmitry Karakozov and Alexander Soloviev, the attempt to dynamite the imperial train in Zaporizhzhia, and the bombing of the Winter Palace in February 1880. The assassination is popularly considered to be the most successful action by the Russian nihilist movement of the 19th century.

Conspirators

On 25–26 August 1879, on the anniversary of his coronation, the 22-member Executive Committee of Narodnaya Volya resolved to assassinate Alexander II in the hopes that it would precipitate a revolution. Over the subsequent year and a half, the various attempts on Alexander's life had ended in failure. The Committee then decided to assassinate Alexander II on his way back to the Winter Palace following his usual Sunday visit to the Mikhailovsky Manège. Andrei Zhelyabov was the chief organizer of the plot. The group had observed his routines for a couple of months and was able to deduce the alternate intentions of the entourage. They found that the Tsar would either head for home by going through Malaya Sadovaya Street or by driving along the Catherine Canal. If by the Malaya Sadovaya, the plan was to detonate a mine placed under the street. To further ensure the success of the plot, four bomb-throwers were to loiter at the corners of the street; after the explosion, all of them were to close in on the Tsar and use their bombs if necessary. If, on the other hand, the Tsar passed by the canal, the bomb-throwers alone were to be relied upon. Ignacy Hryniewiecki (Ignaty Grinevitsky), Nikolai Rysakov, Timofey Mikhailov, and Ivan Yemelyanov had volunteered as bomb-throwers.

The group opened a cheese store in the Eliseyev Emporium on Malaya Sadovaya, and used one of the rooms to dig a tunnel extending to the middle of the street, where they would lay large quantities of dynamite. The hand-held bombs were designed and chiefly manufactured by Nikolai Kibalchich. The night before the attack, Perovskaya along with Vera Figner (also one of seven women on the Executive Committee) helped assemble the bombs.

Zhelyabov was to have directed the bombing, and he was supposed to assail Alexander II with dagger or pistol in case both the mine and the bombs were unsuccessful. When Zhelyabov was arrested two days prior to the attack, his wife Sophia Perovskaya took the reins.

Assassination
The Tsar travelled both to and from the Manège in a closed two-seater carriage drawn by a pair of horses. He was accompanied by five mounted Cossacks and Frank (Franciszek) Joseph Jackowski, a Polish noble, with a sixth Cossack sitting on the coachman's left. The emperor's carriage was followed by three sleighs carrying, among others, the chief of police Colonel Dvorzhitzky and two officers of the Gendarmerie.

On the afternoon of 13 March, after having watched the manoeuvres of two Guard battalions at the Manège, the Tsar's carriage turned into Bolshaya Italyanskaya Street, thus avoiding the mine in Malaya Sadovaya. Perovskaya, by taking out a handkerchief and blowing her nose as a predetermined signal, dispatched the assassins to the Canal. On his way back, the Tsar also decided to pay a brief visit to his cousin, the Grand Duchess Catherine. This gave the bombers ample time to reach the Canal on foot; with the exception of Mikhailov, they all took up their new positions.

At 2:15 PM, the carriage had gone about 150 yards down the quay until it encountered Rysakov who was carrying a bomb wrapped in a handkerchief. On the signal being given by Perovskaya, Rysakov threw the bomb under the Tsar's carriage. The Cossack who rode behind (Alexander Maleichev) was mortally wounded and died later that day. Among those injured was a fourteen year old peasant boy (Nikolai Zakharov) who served as a delivery boy in a butcher's shop. However, the explosion had only damaged the bulletproof carriage. The emperor emerged shaken but unhurt. Rysakov was captured almost immediately. Police Chief Dvorzhitsky heard Rysakov shout out to someone else in the gathering crowd. The coachman implored the Emperor not to alight. Dvorzhitzky offered to drive the Tsar back to the Palace in his sleigh. The Tsar agreed, but he decided to first see the culprit, and to survey the damage. He expressed solicitude for the victims. To the anxious inquires of his entourage, Alexander replied, "Thank God, I'm untouched".

He was ready to drive away when a second bomber, Hryniewiecki, who had come close to the Tsar, made a sudden movement, throwing a bomb at his feet. A second explosion ripped through the air and the Emperor and his assassin fell to the ground, both mortally injured. Since people had crowded close to the Tsar, Hryniewiecki's bomb claimed more injuries than the first (according to Dvorzhitsky, who was himself injured, there were about 20 people with wounds of varying degree). Alexander was leaning on his right arm. His legs were shattered below the knee from which he was bleeding profusely, his abdomen was torn open, and his face was mutilated. Hryniewiecki himself, also gravely wounded from the blast, lay next to the Tsar and the butcher's boy.

Ivan Yemelyanov, the third bomber in the crowd, stood ready, clutching a briefcase containing a bomb that would be used if the other two bombers failed. However, he instead along with other bystanders rushed to answer the Tsar's barely audible cries for help; he could barely whisper: "Take me to the palace... there... I will die." Alexander was carried by sleigh to his study in the Winter Palace, where almost the same day twenty years earlier, he had signed the Emancipation Edict freeing the serfs. Members of the Romanov family came rushing to the scene. The dying emperor was given Communion and Last rites. When the attending physician, Sergey Botkin, was asked how long it would be, he replied, "Up to fifteen minutes." At 3:30 that day, the personal flag of Alexander II was lowered for the last time.

Arrests, trials, and punishments
The thrower of the fatal second bomb, Hryniewiecki, was carried to the military hospital nearby, where he lingered in agony for several hours. Refusing to cooperate with the authorities or even to give his name, he died that evening. In a vain attempt to save his own life, Rysakov, the first bomb-thrower who had been captured at the scene, cooperated with the investigators. His testimony implicated the other participants, and enabled the police to raid the group's headquarters. The raid took place on March 15, two days after the assassination. Helfman was arrested and Sablin fired several shots at the police and then shot himself to avoid capture. Mikhailov was captured in the same building the next day after a brief gunfight. The tsarist police apprehended Sophia Perovskaya on March 22, Nikolai Kibalchich on March 29, and Ivan Yemelyanov on April 14.

Zhelyabov, Perovskaya, Kibalchich, Helfman, Mikhailov, and Rysakov were tried by the Special Tribunal of the Ruling Senate on March 26–29 and sentenced to death by hanging. The sentence was duly carried out upon the State criminals on April 15, 1881. In the case of Hesya Helfman, her execution was deferred on account of her pregnancy. Alexander III later commuted her sentence of death to katorga (forced labor) for an indefinite period of time. She died of a post-natal complication in January 1882, and her infant daughter did not long survive her.

Yemelyanov was tried the following year and was sentenced to life imprisonment at hard labor; however, he received a pardon from the Tsar after serving 20 years. Vera Figner remained at large until 10 February 1883; during this time she orchestrated the assassination of General Mayor Strelnikov, the military prosecutor of Odessa. In 1884, Figner was sentenced to die by hanging which was then commuted to indefinite penal servitude. She likewise served for 20 years until a plea from her dying mother persuaded the last tsar, Nicholas II, to set her free.

Aftermath

A temporary shrine was erected on the site of the attack while plans and fundraising for a more permanent memorial were undertaken. In order to build a permanent shrine on the exact spot where the assassination took place, it was decided to narrow the canal so that the section of road on which the tsar had been driving could be included within the walls of the church. The permanent memorial took the form of the Church of the Savior on Blood. Construction began in 1883 under Alexander III, and was completed in 1907 under Nicholas II. An elaborate shrine, in the form of a ciborium, was constructed at the end of the church opposite the altar, on the exact place of Alexander's assassination. It is embellished with topaz, lazurite, and other semi-precious stones, making a striking contrast with the simple cobblestones of the old road, which are exposed in the floor of the shrine.

References

Citations

Bibliography 
 
 
 
 
 
 
 

1880s in Saint Petersburg
1881 in the Russian Empire
1881 murders in the Russian Empire
Alexander II of Russia
Assassinations in the Russian Empire
Deaths by person in the Russian Empire
Deaths by suicide bomber
Deaths from bleeding
March 1881 events
Murder in the Russian Empire
Narodnaya Volya
Russian Empire regicides
Suicide bombings in Russia
Terrorism in the Russian Empire
Terrorist incidents in Saint Petersburg